Akshay Chandra Sarkar (11 December 1846 – 2 October 1917) was a poet, an editor and a literary critic of Bengali literature. He was an editor  weekly Sadharani (1874).

References

Presidency University, Kolkata alumni
Writers from Kolkata
University of Calcutta alumni
1846 births
1917 deaths
Bengali Hindus
People from Hooghly district
Indian literary critics
Indian editors
19th-century Indian journalists
Bengali-language writers